Shed No Tears is a 2013 Swedish film directed by Måns Mårlind and Björn Stein and starring Adam Lundgren and Jonathan Andersson. The plot is based on the lyrics and music by Swedish artist Håkan Hellström, and the script is written by Cilla Jackert. The film premiered on 19 July 2013 and was well received by critics. It won the Guldbagge Award for Best Sound Editing at the 49th Guldbagge Awards.

The main role is played by Adam Lundgren, while Tomas von Brömssen, Gunilla Nyroos and Josefin Neldén appear in supporting roles. Even Håkan Hellström himself appears in a minor role. The film's title is based on Hellström's debut single "Känn ingen sorg för mig Göteborg" from the album of the same name.

The film received extensive good reviews, and 27,766 Swedes saw it at the cinema on the opening weekend, which took it up to Biotoppens second place. The following week it had dropped down to sixth place, and at the end of the year was the year's fifth highest grossing Swedish film.

Plot
Pål (Adam Lundgren)'s biggest dream is to get involved with music. His childhood friends Lena (Josefin Neldén) and Johnny (Jonathan Andersson) knows this, and his grandfather Rolle (Tomas von Brömssen), although he most of all would see that Pål gained an orderly job. When Eva (Disa Östrand) turns up as a summer night and captures Påls attention, she discovers that she shares his dream. The problem is that the only thing standing between Pål and the dream is his own obsessions that once after another leads him to derail just when most are at stake.

Cast

 Adam Lundgren as Pål
 Disa Östrand as Eva
 Josefin Neldén as Lena
 Jonathan Andersson as Johnny
 Tomas von Brömssen as Rolle, Pål's grandfather
 Marie Richardson as Lisbeth Lindén
 Reine Brynolfsson as Bosse
 Gunilla Nyroos as Hopp
 Daniel Larsson as Isse
 Eric Ericson as Priest
 Kim Lantz as Denis
 Hanna Hedin Hillberg as Samba Dancer
 Gregers Dohn as Pusher
 Darko Savor as Thug
 Lucas Miklin as Hooligan
 Freddie Wadling as A-lagare
 Ebbot Lundberg as A-lagare
 Håkan Hellström as a Street musician

Critical response
The film received overwhelmingly positive reviews from Swedish critics. Aftonbladet called it "Beats the most ever seen in the Swedish film", and gave it a rating of 5 out of 5. The rival newspaper, Expressen called it "Hellström knew what he was doing", and gave it a rating of 4 out of 5. The film site Moviezine, called it a "Musical treat", and gave it a rating of 4 out of 5.

Awards and nominations

49th Guldbagge Awards
For the 49th Guldbagge Awards, Shed No Tears was nominated for nine awards, some of which it won in the categories Best Editing and Best Sound Editing:

MovieZine Awards 2013
MovieZine did a poll at the end of 2013, in which readers got to vote for winners in various categories with substance Movie Year 2013, which Shed No Tears won in the category Best Swedish film, with 49% of the 2555 votes that was sent in. Adam Lundgren, also won the vote in the category Best Breakthrough for his role as Pål in the film.

References

External links
Official trailer
 
 Full list of employees associated with movie (in English)

Swedish musical films
Films directed by Måns Mårlind
Films directed by Björn Stein
Films shot in Gothenburg
Films set in Gothenburg
2010s Swedish-language films
2010s Swedish films